Alden Erskine (May 2, 1901 – January 13, 1991) was an American politician who served in the Iowa Senate from 1967 to 1973.

References

1901 births
1991 deaths
Republican Party Iowa state senators